Ham Lake is a city in Minnesota, United States.

Ham Lake may also refer to:

 Ham Lake (Hubbard County, Minnesota), a lake in Hubbard County, Minnesota
 Ham Lake (Morrison County, Minnesota), a lake in Morrison County, Minnesota
 Ham Lake (Burnett County, Wisconsin), a lake in Burnett County, Wisconsin
 Ham Lake (Forest County, Wisconsin), a lake in Forest County, Wisconsin
 Ham Lake (Sawyer County, Wisconsin), a lake in Sawyer County, Wisconsin